Jonas Arntzen (born 21 November 1997) is a Norwegian ice hockey player for Örebro HK and the Norwegian national team.

He represented Norway at the 2021 IIHF World Championship.

References

External links

1997 births
Living people
Almtuna IS players
Leksands IF players
Lillehammer IK players
Norwegian expatriate ice hockey people
Norwegian expatriate sportspeople in Sweden
Norwegian ice hockey goaltenders
Örebro HK players
Sportspeople from Lillehammer